1991 in the Philippines details events of note that happened in the Philippines in the year 1991.

Incumbents

 President: Corazon Aquino (PDP-Laban)
 Vice President: Salvador Laurel (UNIDO)
 President of the Senate: Jovito Salonga
 Speaker of the House of Representatives: Ramon Mitra, Jr.
 Chief Justice:
Marcelo Fernan (until December 6)
Andres Narvasa (starting December 6)
 Philippine Congress: 8th Congress of the Philippines

Events

January 
 January 29 – The Philippine Constabulary and the Integrated National Police are merged to form the Philippine National Police.

February 
 February 10 – Lenny Villa, a first-year Ateneo Law student, dies of serious physical injuries after three days of bloody hazing rites by the members of Aquila Legis fraternity.

June 
 June 10 – About 15,000 Americans are evacuated from Clark Air Base as Pinatubo eruption begins.
 June 15 – Mount Pinatubo erupts, the peak of series of major explosions on June 12–16, in what will be the second largest terrestrial eruption of the 20th century; volcano's alert level has been raised to the highest, June 9; Typhoon Yunya further worsens lahar flows and ashfalls causing collapse of roofs on structures that contribute to about 350 of 847 deaths. The eruption costs US$700-million in total damages.
 June 28 – SM Megamall is opened as the third SM Supermall in the Philippines.
 June 30 – Three members of Vizconde family are murdered at their home in Parañaque. The case becomes controversial as eight sons of prominent families are involved. The Supreme Court in 2010 would reverse the 2000 conviction of six of them, including Hubert Webb; the rest are still at large. A policeman, also convicted, would be sentenced to a prison term.

July 
 July 2 - Eldon Maguan, an engineering student at De La Salle University, was shot in the head by Rolito Go in a road rage incident in San Juan, Metro Manila. Go was convicted of frustrated homicide, which was elevated to murder after Maguan died of his wounds days after. Go was eventually sentenced to reclusión perpetua only to escape and be re-arrested on multiple occasions from 1994 to 2012. He was eventually released from prison in 2016 upon completion of his sentence.
 July 13 – Maureen Hultman and John Chapman were murdered by Claudio Teehankee, Jr. The case was controversial as Teehankee is the son of a former Chief Justice.

September 
 September 16 – The Senate, by a 12–11 vote, rejects the proposed RP-US Treaty of Friendship, Cooperation and Peace, which would have extended American military presence at Subic Bay Naval Base. American troops earlier abandoned Clark Air Base after Pinatubo erupted, and completed their withdrawal from Subic in 1992.

October 
 October 10 – The Local Government Code is signed into law.

November 
 November 3 – Former First Lady Imelda Marcos returns to the country to face charges against her.
 November 4–5 – Tropical Storm Uring lashes into Eastern Visayas, leaving 8,000 people dead as a result of widespread flooding in the coastal city of Ormoc, Leyte.
 November 27 – US closes and surrenders Clark Air Base.

Holidays

As per Executive Order No. 292, chapter 7 section 26, the following are regular holidays and special days, approved on July 25, 1987. Note that in the list, holidays in bold are "regular holidays" and those in italics are "nationwide special days".

 January 1 – New Year's Day
 March 28 – Maundy Thursday
 March 29 – Good Friday
 April 9 – Araw ng Kagitingan (Day of Valor)
 May 1 – Labor Day
 June 12 – Independence Day 
 August 25 – National Heroes Day
 November 1 –  All Saints Day
 November 30 – Bonifacio Day
 December 25 – Christmas Day
 December 30 – Rizal Day
 December 31 – Last Day of the Year

In addition, several other places observe local holidays, such as the foundation of their town. These are also "special days."

Television

These are TV programs that premiered and had their finales this year.

Premieres
 Abangan Ang Susunod Na Kabanata, comedy (1991–1997)
 Maalaala Mo Kaya, drama anthology (1991–present)
 Kape at Balita, morning show (1991–1993)

Finales
 Chika Chika Chicks, comedy (1987–1991)
 Goin' Bananas, comedy (1987–1991)

Sports
 November 24–December 3 – Manila is selected again as a host city in the 16th Southeast Asian Games, ten years since the 11th SEA Games held in the same city in 1981. The Philippine team participate in the 16th SEA Games and place second with 91 gold, 62 silver and 84 bronze medals for a total of 237 medals ahead of Indonesia is in the first place.

Births
 January 14 – Kristel Moreno, actress
 February 5 – Juami Tiongson, basketball player
 February 12 – Simon Enciso, basketball player
 February 20:
 Joshua Beloya, football player
 Hidilyn Diaz, weightlifter and Olympic gold medalist
 February 21 – Jon Timmons, actor, model, and television personality
 March 18 – Jeric Teng, basketball player
 April 1 – Franco Hernandez, member of Hashtags (d. 2017)
 April 4 – Marlon Stöckinger, racing driver
 May 3 – Bela Padilla, actress
 May 9 – Kenneth Medrano, actor and model
 May 15 – Gerald Santos, actor and singer
 May 28 – Beauty Gonzalez, actress and model
 May 29 – Vin Abrenica, actor
 June 16 – Ryan Bang, Korean actor and comedian
 July 1 – Kim Molina, actress
 July 17 – Maverick Ahanmisi, basketball player
 July 19 – Arny Ross, actress
 August 4 – Neil Coleta, actor
 August 13 – Kayla Rivera, singer
 August 18 – Ed Daquioag, basketball player
 August 19 – Nathan Lopez, actor
 August 21 – Carl Bryan Cruz, basketball player
 August 25 – Marisa Park, football player
 August 26 – Wil Dasovich, model and vlogger
 September 6 – Klarisse de Guzman, singer
 September 27 – Ynna Asistio, actress
 October 4 – Nico Elorde, basketball player
 October 22 – Melissa Gohing, volleyball player
 October 27 – Lincoln Velasquez, vlogger
 November 13 – Kevin Alas, basketball player
 James Forrester, basketball player
 December 11 – Mikhail Red, independent filmmaker
 December 12 – Michael DiGregorio, basketball player

Deaths
 April 25 – Lamberto V. Avellana (b. 1915), film and stage director
 May 21 – Lino Brocka (b. 1939), film director
 July 11 – Atang de la Rama (b. 1902), film actress and singer

References

 
1991 in Southeast Asia
Philippines
1990s in the Philippines
Years of the 20th century in the Philippines